Molybdenum deficiency refers to the clinical consequences of inadequate supplies of molybdenum in the diet.

The amount of molybdenum required is relatively small, and molybdenum deficiency usually does not occur in natural settings. However, it can occur in individuals receiving parenteral nutrition.

Signs and symptoms
Descriptions of human molybdenum deficiency are few. A patient receiving prolonged parenteral nutrition acquired a syndrome described as ‘acquired molybdenum deficiency.’ This syndrome, exacerbated by methionine administration, was characterized by high blood methionine, low blood uric acid, and low urinary uric acid and sulfate concentrations. The patient suffered mental disturbances that progressed to a coma. Pathological changes occurring in individuals with a genetic disease that results in a sulfite oxidase (a molybdoenzyme) deficiency include increased plasma and urine sulfite, sulfate, thiosulfate, S-sulfocysteine and taurine; seizures, and brain atrophy/lesions; dislocated lenses; and death at an early age.

Diagnosis

Treatment

300 mcg Ammonium Molybdate per day can bring about recovery of “acquired molybdenum deficiency” [3]

See also 
 Molybdenum cofactor deficiency

References

Further reading

External links 

Mineral deficiencies
Deficiency